The 1928 Oklahoma Sooners football team represented the University of Oklahoma in the 1928 college football season. In their second year under head coach Adrian Lindsey, the Sooners compiled a 5–3 record (3–2 against conference opponents), finished in third place in the Big Six Conference, and outscored their opponents by a combined total of 120 to 88.

No Sooners received All-America honors in 1928, though end Tom Churchill received all-conference honors.

Schedule

Source:

References

Oklahoma
Oklahoma Sooners football seasons
Oklahoma Sooners football